Jared Borgetti is a retired footballer who represented the Mexico national football team and was his country's all-time highest goalscorer for twelve years with 46 goals until Javier Hernández surpassed him in 2017. He appeared 89 times for Mexico between 1997 and 2008. He made his debut on 5 February 1997 in a friendly against Ecuador at Estadio Azteca, scoring the second goal in a 3–1 victory.

Borgetti became his country's top scorer when he scored his 36th goal against Costa Rica in a 2006 FIFA World Cup qualifier in September 2005; at the time the record of 35 was held jointly by Carlos Hermosillo and Luis Hernández.

Out of Borgetti's 46 goals, 37 were in official matches while 9 came in friendlies. Borgetti has scored more goals (five) against Saint Vincent and the Grenadines and Trinidad and Tobago than any other nations. Borgetti scored a hat-trick in a 2002 FIFA World Cup qualifier against Trinidad and Tobago and scored four in a 7–0 victory over Saint Vincent and the Grenadines in a 2006 FIFA World Cup qualifier. Borgetti was the worldwide top scorer in 2006 FIFA World Cup qualification with 14 goals.

Goals

Statistics

References

Mexico national football team
Borgetti, Jared
Borgetti